Yolcu is a surname of Turkish origin. Notable people with the surname include:

 Mürtüz Yolcu (born 1961), German-Turkish actor and theatre festival founder
 Yavuz Yolcu (born 1966), Turkish judoka

See also
 

Surnames of Turkish origin